Ethan Allen (1738–1789) was an early American and Vermont revolutionary.

Ethan Allen may also refer to:

People
 Ethan B. Allen (1781–1835), New York politician
 Ethan Allen (priest) (1796–1879), Episcopal archivist and author in Maryland, as well as minister in Ohio and Kentucky
 Ethan Allen (armsmaker) (1808–1871), American gunsmith
 Ethan Allen (baseball) (1904–1993), player and coach
 Ethan Allen (music producer), American record producer and musician

Places
 Fort Ethan Allen, former U.S. Army installation and current neighborhood in Colchester, Vermont, US
 Fort Ethan Allen (Arlington, Virginia) (1861–1865), Civil War defense of Washington, D.C., US

Ships
 USS Ethan Allen (1859) (1859–1865), Civil War era Union Navy 556-ton bark
 USS Ethan Allen (SSBN-608) (1960–1983), U.S. Navy ballistic missile submarine (SSBN-608)
 Ethan Allen-class submarine (1960–1992)
 Ethan Allen, a tour boat that sank in the Ethan Allen boating accident

Other uses
 Ethan Allen (horse)  (1849–1876), trotting racehorse
 Ethan Allen (company), American furniture chain
 Statue of Ethan Allen, a marble sculpture depicting Ethan Allen by Larkin Goldsmith Mead
 Ethan Allen Express, a passenger train operated by Amtrak

See also
 Ethan (given name)
 Allen (surname)